Two Canadian naval units have been named HMCS Glace Bay.

  (I), a River-class frigate was commissioned 2 September 1944 into the Royal Canadian Navy. She was paid off 17 November 1945 and sold to the Chilean Navy.

Battle honours

 Atlantic, 1944–45

References
 Government of Canada Ships' Histories - HMCS Glace Bay

Royal Canadian Navy ship names